BGA may refer to:

Organizations
 Battle Ground Academy, a private school in Franklin, Tennessee, US
 Behavior Genetics Association
 Boldklubberne Glostrup Albertslund, a Danish football club
 British Gear Association
 British Gliding Association
 British Go Association
 British Geophysical Association
 British-German Association
 Palonegro International Airport, Colombia, by IATA code
 The Bundesverband Großhandel, Außenhandel, Dienstleistungen (The Federation of German Wholesale, Foreign Trade and Services)

Other uses
 Ball grid array, a type of surface-mount packaging used for integrated circuits
 Cyanobacteria (blue-green algae)
 Break glass alarm, a type of manually activated fire alarm; see Fire alarm pull station
 Bach-Gesellschaft Ausgabe, the first complete edition of Johann Sebastian Bach's compositions
 Boys Generally Asian (BgA), a parody K-Pop group